Phyllonorycter is a genus of moths in the family Gracillariidae.

Diversity
The genus comprises about 400 species, with a worldwide distribution. The vast majority of species are found in the temperate regions, with about 257 species described from the Palaearctic region and 81 from the Nearctic. In the tropics, the genus is species-poor, with 36 species described from Indo-Australia, 13 from the Neotropics and 22 from the Afrotropical region. In 2012, a further 27 species were described from the Afrotropics.

Species

Phyllonorycter aarviki de Prins, 2012
Phyllonorycter aberrans (Braun, 1930)
Phyllonorycter abrasella (Duponchel, [1843])
Phyllonorycter acaciella (Duponchel, 1843)
Phyllonorycter acanthus Davis & Deschka, 2001
Phyllonorycter acerifoliella (Zeller, 1839)
Phyllonorycter aceripestis (Kuznetzov, 1978)
Phyllonorycter aceriphaga (Kuznetzov, 1975)
Phyllonorycter achilleus de Prins, 2012
Phyllonorycter acratynta (Meyrick, 1916)
Phyllonorycter acutissimae (Kumata, 1963)
Phyllonorycter acutulus de Prins, 2012
Phyllonorycter adderis de Prins, 2012
Phyllonorycter adenocarpi (Staudinger, 1863)
Phyllonorycter aemula Triberti, Deschka & Huemer, 1997
Phyllonorycter aeriferella (Clemens, 1859)
Phyllonorycter agassizi de Prins, 2012
Phyllonorycter agilella (Zeller, 1846)
Phyllonorycter aino (Kumata, 1963)
Phyllonorycter alaskana Deschka, 1982
Phyllonorycter albanotella (Chambers, 1875)
Phyllonorycter albertinus de Prins, 2012
Phyllonorycter albimacula (Walsingham, 1897)
Phyllonorycter alluaudiella (Chrétien, 1922)
Phyllonorycter alni (Walsingham, 1891)
Phyllonorycter alnicolella (Walsingham, 1889)
Phyllonorycter alnivorella (Ragonot, 1875)
Phyllonorycter alpina (Frey, 1856)
Phyllonorycter amseli (Povolný & Gregor, 1955)
Phyllonorycter anceps Triberti, 2007
Phyllonorycter anchistea (Vári, 1961)
Phyllonorycter andalusicus Lastuvka & Lastuvka, 2006
Phyllonorycter anderidae (W. Fletcher, 1885)
Phyllonorycter antiochella (Opler, 1971)
Phyllonorycter antitoxa (Meyrick, 1915)
Phyllonorycter apicinigrella (Braun, 1908)
Phyllonorycter apparella (Herrich-Schäffer, 1855)
Phyllonorycter arbutusella (Braun, 1908)
Phyllonorycter argentifimbriella (Clemens, 1859)
Phyllonorycter argentifrontella (Walsingham, 1897)
Phyllonorycter argentinotella (Clemens, 1859)
Phyllonorycter argyrolobiella Nel, 2009
Phyllonorycter arizonella (Braun, 1925)
Phyllonorycter armeniella (Kuznetzov, 1958)
Phyllonorycter auronitens (Frey & Boll, 1873)
Phyllonorycter baetica Lastuvka & Lastuvka, 2006
Phyllonorycter baldensis Deschka, 1986
Phyllonorycter barbarella (Rebel, 1901)
Phyllonorycter bartolomella (Deschka, 1968)
Phyllonorycter bascanaula (Meyrick, 1936)
Phyllonorycter basistrigella (Clemens, 1859)
Phyllonorycter bataviella (Braun, 1908)
Phyllonorycter belotella (Staudinger, 1859)
Phyllonorycter bicinctella (Matsumura, 1931)
Phyllonorycter bifurcata (Kumata, 1967)
Phyllonorycter blancardella (Fabricius, 1781)
Phyllonorycter brachylaenae (Vári, 1961)
Phyllonorycter brunnea Deschka, 1975
Phyllonorycter caraganella (Ermolaev, 1986)
Phyllonorycter carpini (Kumata, 1963)
Phyllonorycter caryaealbella (Chambers, 1871)
Phyllonorycter caspica Noreika, 1992
Phyllonorycter caudasimplex Bland, 1980
Phyllonorycter cavella (Zeller, 1846)
Phyllonorycter celtidis (Kumata, 1963)
Phyllonorycter celtifoliella (Chambers, 1871)
Phyllonorycter celtisella (Chambers, 1871)
Phyllonorycter cephalariae (Lhomme, 1934)
Phyllonorycter cerasicolella (Herrich-Schäffer, 1855)
Phyllonorycter cerasinella (Reutti, 1853)
Phyllonorycter cerisolella (Peyerimhoff, 1871)
Phyllonorycter chalcobaphes (Walsingham, 1914)
Phyllonorycter chiclanella (Staudinger, 1859)
Phyllonorycter chionopa (Vári, 1961)
Phyllonorycter christenseni Derra, 1985
Phyllonorycter chrysella (Constant, 1885)
Phyllonorycter cinctata Kumata, 1973
Phyllonorycter cistifoliella (Groschke, 1944)
Phyllonorycter clemensella (Chambers, 1871)
Phyllonorycter clepsiphaga (Meyrick, 1922)
Phyllonorycter clerotoma (Meyrick, 1915)
Phyllonorycter cocciferella (Mendes, 1910)
Phyllonorycter comparella (Duponchel, 1843)
Phyllonorycter comptoniella (Darlington, 1949)
Phyllonorycter conformis (Meyrick, 1910)
Phyllonorycter conista (Meyrick, 1911)
Phyllonorycter connexella (Zeller, 1846)
Phyllonorycter coryli (Nicelli, 1851)
Phyllonorycter corylifoliella (Hübner, 1796)
Phyllonorycter crataegella (Clemens, 1859)
Phyllonorycter cretaceella (Braun, 1925)
Phyllonorycter cretata (Kumata, 1957)
Phyllonorycter crimea Baryshnikova & Budashkin, 2005
Phyllonorycter cydoniella ([Denis & Schiffermüller], 1775)
Phyllonorycter cytisella (Rebel, 1896)
Phyllonorycter cytisifoliae (M. Hering, 1927)
Phyllonorycter cytisus (Hartig & Amsel, 1952)
Phyllonorycter dakekanbae (Kumata, 1963)
Phyllonorycter deceptusella (Chambers, 1879)
Phyllonorycter deleta (Staudinger, 1880)
Phyllonorycter delitella (Duponchel, 1843)
Phyllonorycter dentifera Noreika, 1992
Phyllonorycter deschkai Triberti, 2007
Phyllonorycter deschkanus Lastuvka & Lastuvka, 2006
Phyllonorycter deserticola Davis & Deschka, 2001
Phyllonorycter diaphanella (Frey & Boll, 1878)
Phyllonorycter didymopa (Vári, 1961)
Phyllonorycter distentella (Zeller, 1846)
Phyllonorycter diversella (Braun, 1916)
Phyllonorycter dombeyae de Prins, 2012
Phyllonorycter drepanota (Meyrick, 1928)
Phyllonorycter dubiosella (Wocke, 1877)
Phyllonorycter dubitella (Herrich-Schäffer, 1855)
Phyllonorycter durangensis Deschka, 1982
Phyllonorycter echinosparti Lastuvka & Lastuvka, 2006
Phyllonorycter elmaella Doğanlar & Mutuura, 1980
Phyllonorycter emberizaepenella (Bouché, 1834)
Phyllonorycter encaeria (Meyrick, 1911)
Phyllonorycter enchalcoa (Turner, 1939)
Phyllonorycter endryella (Mann, 1855)
Phyllonorycter engelhardiae Kumata, 1973
Phyllonorycter epichares (Meyrick, 1928)
Phyllonorycter epispila (Meyrick, 1915)
Phyllonorycter eratantha (Meyrick, 1922)
Phyllonorycter erinaceae Lastuvka & Lastuvka, 2013
Phyllonorycter ermani (Kumata, 1963)
Phyllonorycter erugatus Davis & Deschka, 2001
Phyllonorycter esperella (Goeze, 1783)
Phyllonorycter estrela Lastukva & Lastuvka, 2006
Phyllonorycter etnensis Lastuvka & Lastuvka, 2006
Phyllonorycter eugregori Lastuvka & Lastuvka, 2006
Phyllonorycter extincta (Deschka, 1974)
Phyllonorycter fabaceaella (Kuznetzov, 1978)
Phyllonorycter fagifolia (Kumata, 1963)
Phyllonorycter farensis De Prins & De Prins, 2007
Phyllonorycter fasciformis (Meyrick, 1930)
Phyllonorycter fitchella (Clemens, 1860)
Phyllonorycter fiumella (Krone, 1911)
Phyllonorycter flava Deschka, 1975
Phyllonorycter fletcheri de Prins, 2012
Phyllonorycter foliolosi Walsingham, 1907
Phyllonorycter formosella (Legrand, 1965)
Phyllonorycter fragilella (Frey & Boll, 1878)
Phyllonorycter fraxinella (Zeller, 1846)
Phyllonorycter froelichiella (Zeller, 1839)
Phyllonorycter fruticosella (Kuznetzov, 1979)
Phyllonorycter ganodes (Meyrick, 1918)
Phyllonorycter gato de Prins, 2012
Phyllonorycter gemmea (Frey & Boll, 1873)
Phyllonorycter geniculella (Ragonot, 1874)
Phyllonorycter genistella (Rebel, 1901)
Phyllonorycter gerasimowi (M. Hering, 1930)
Phyllonorycter gerfriedi Lastuvka & Lastuvka, 2007
Phyllonorycter gigas (Kumata, 1963)
Phyllonorycter ginnalae (Ermolaev, 1981)
Phyllonorycter gozmanyi De Prins & De Prins, 2007
Phyllonorycter gracilis Noreika, 1994
Phyllonorycter graecus Lastuvka & Lastuvka, 2007
Phyllonorycter grewiaecola (Vári, 1961)
Phyllonorycter grewiaephilos de Prins, 2012
Phyllonorycter grewiella (Vári, 1961)
Phyllonorycter haasi (Rebel, 1901)
Phyllonorycter hagenii (Frey & Boll, 1873)
Phyllonorycter hancola (Kumata, 1958)
Phyllonorycter hapalotoxa (Meyrick, 1921)
Phyllonorycter harrisella (Linnaeus, 1761)
Phyllonorycter heegeriella (Zeller, 1846)
Phyllonorycter helianthemella (Herrich-Schäffer, 1861)
Phyllonorycter hesperiella (Staudinger, 1859)
Phyllonorycter hibiscina (Vári, 1961)
Phyllonorycter hibiscola de Prins, 2012
Phyllonorycter hikosana (Kumata, 1963)
Phyllonorycter hilarella (Zetterstedt, 1839)
Phyllonorycter himalayana Kumata, 1973
Phyllonorycter hissarella Noreika, 1993
Phyllonorycter holodisci (Braun, 1939)
Phyllonorycter hostis Triberti, 2007
Phyllonorycter humilitatis Kumata, 1973
Phyllonorycter idolias (Meyrick, 1891)
Phyllonorycter ilicifoliella (Duponchel, 1843)
Phyllonorycter incanella (Walsingham, 1889)
Phyllonorycter incurvata (Meyrick, 1916)
Phyllonorycter infirma Deschka, 1975
Phyllonorycter insignis (Walsingham, 1889)
Phyllonorycter insignitella (Zeller, 1846)
Phyllonorycter intermixta (Braun, 1930)
Phyllonorycter inusitatella (Braun, 1925)
Phyllonorycter iochrysis (Meyrick, 1931)
Phyllonorycter ipomoellus de Prins, 2012
Phyllonorycter iranica Deschka, 1979
Phyllonorycter iriphanes (Meyrick, 1915)
Phyllonorycter issikii (Kumata, 1963)
Phyllonorycter iteina (Meyrick, 1918)
Phyllonorycter jabalshamsi de Prins, 2012
Phyllonorycter japonica (Kumata, 1963)
Phyllonorycter jezoniella (Matsumura, 1931)
Phyllonorycter joannisi (Le Marchand, 1936)
Phyllonorycter jozanae (Kumata, 1967)
Phyllonorycter juglandicola (Kuznetzov, 1975)
Phyllonorycter juglandis (Kumata, 1963)
Phyllonorycter juncei Walsingham, 1907
Phyllonorycter junoniella (Zeller, 1846)
Phyllonorycter kamijoi (Kumata, 1963)
Phyllonorycter kautziella (Hartig, 1938)
Phyllonorycter kazuri de Prins, 2012
Phyllonorycter kearfottella (Braun, 1908)
Phyllonorycter kisoensis Kumata & Park, 1978
Phyllonorycter klemannella (Fabricius, 1781)
Phyllonorycter klimeschiella (Deschka, 1970)
Phyllonorycter koreana Kumata & Park, 1978
Phyllonorycter kuhlweiniella (Zeller, 1839)
Phyllonorycter kumatai De Prins & De Prins, 2005
Phyllonorycter kurokoi (Kumata, 1963)
Phyllonorycter kusdasi (Deschka, 1970)
Phyllonorycter kuznetzovi (Ermolaev, 1982)
Phyllonorycter laciniatae (Kumata, 1967)
Phyllonorycter lalagella (Newman, 1856)
Phyllonorycter lantanae (Vári, 1961)
Phyllonorycter lantanella (Schrank, 1802)
Phyllonorycter lapadiella (Krone, 1909)
Phyllonorycter latus Davis & Deschka, 2001
Phyllonorycter laurocerasi (Kuznetzov, 1979)
Phyllonorycter lautella (Zeller, 1846)
Phyllonorycter ledella (Walsingham, 1889)
Phyllonorycter lemarchandi (Viette, 1951)
Phyllonorycter leucaspis Triberti, 2004
Phyllonorycter leucocorona (Kumata, 1957)
Phyllonorycter leucographella (Zeller, 1850)
Phyllonorycter libanotica (Deschka, 1972)
Phyllonorycter linifoliella (Rungs, 1942)
Phyllonorycter longispinata (Kumata, 1958)
Phyllonorycter lonicerae (Kumata, 1963)
Phyllonorycter loniceriphaga Noreika, 1992
Phyllonorycter loxozona (Meyrick, 1936)
Phyllonorycter lucetiella (Clemens, 1859)
Phyllonorycter lucidicostella (Clemens, 1859)
Phyllonorycter luzonica Kumata, 1995
Phyllonorycter lyoniae (Kumata, 1963)
Phyllonorycter lysimachiaeella (Chambers, 1875)
Phyllonorycter macedonica (Deschka, 1971)
Phyllonorycter macrantherella (Kuznetzov, 1961)
Phyllonorycter maculata (Kumata, 1963)
Phyllonorycter madagascariensis (Viette, 1949)
Phyllonorycter maererei de Prins, 2012
Phyllonorycter maestingella (Müller, 1764)
Phyllonorycter malayana Kumata, 1993
Phyllonorycter malella (Gerasimov, 1931)
Phyllonorycter malicola (Kuznetzov, 1979)
Phyllonorycter mannii (Zeller, 1846)
Phyllonorycter manzanita (Braun, 1925)
Phyllonorycter mariaeella (Chambers, 1875)
Phyllonorycter martiella (Braun, 1908)
Phyllonorycter matsudai Kumata, 1986
Phyllonorycter medicaginella (Gerasimov, 1930)
Phyllonorycter melacoronis (Kumata, 1963)
Phyllonorycter melanosparta (Meyrick, 1912)
Phyllonorycter melhaniae (Vári, 1961)
Phyllonorycter memorabilis (Braun, 1939)
Phyllonorycter menaea (Meyrick, 1918)
Phyllonorycter mespilella (Hübner, 1805)
Phyllonorycter messaniella (Zeller, 1846)
Phyllonorycter mida de Prins, 2012
Phyllonorycter mildredae Davis & Deschka, 2001
Phyllonorycter millierella (Staudinger, 1871)
Phyllonorycter minutella (Frey & Boll, 1878)
Phyllonorycter mirbeckifoliae Deschka, 1974
Phyllonorycter mongolicae (Kumata, 1963)
Phyllonorycter monspessulanella (Fuchs, 1897)
Phyllonorycter montanella Bradley, 1980
Phyllonorycter muelleriella (Zeller, 1839)
Phyllonorycter mwatawalai de Prins, 2012
Phyllonorycter myricae Deschka, 1976
Phyllonorycter myricella Kumata, 1995
Phyllonorycter nepalensis Kumata, 1973
Phyllonorycter nevadensis Walsingham, 1908
Phyllonorycter nicellii (Stainton, 1851)
Phyllonorycter nigrescentella (Logan, 1851)
Phyllonorycter nigristella (Kumata, 1957)
Phyllonorycter nipigon (Freeman, 1970)
Phyllonorycter nipponicella (Issiki, 1930)
Phyllonorycter nivalis Deschka, 1986
Phyllonorycter obandai De Prins & Mozuraitis, 2006
Phyllonorycter obscuricostella (Clemens, 1859)
Phyllonorycter obsoleta (Frey & Boll, 1873)
Phyllonorycter obtusifoliella Deschka, 1974
Phyllonorycter occitanica (Frey & Boll, 1876)
Phyllonorycter ocimellus de Prins, 2012
Phyllonorycter olivaeformis (Braun, 1908)
Phyllonorycter ololua de Prins, 2012
Phyllonorycter olympica Deschka, 1983
Phyllonorycter oreas Kumata, 1973
Phyllonorycter oregonensis (Walsingham, 1889)
Phyllonorycter orientalis (Kumata, 1963)
Phyllonorycter ostryae (Kumata, 1963)
Phyllonorycter ostryaefoliella (Clemens, 1859)
Phyllonorycter ovalifoliae Kumata, 1973
Phyllonorycter oxyacanthae (Frey, 1855)
Phyllonorycter oxygrapta (Meyrick, 1915)
Phyllonorycter parisiella (Wocke, 1848)
Phyllonorycter parvifoliella (Ragonot, 1875)
Phyllonorycter pastorella (Zeller, 1846)
Phyllonorycter pavoniae (Vári, 1961)
Phyllonorycter penangensis Kumata, 1993
Phyllonorycter pernivalis (Braun, 1925)
Phyllonorycter persimilis Fujihara, Sato & Kumata, 2001
Phyllonorycter philerasta (Meyrick, 1922)
Phyllonorycter phyllocytisi (M. Hering, 1936)
Phyllonorycter pictus (Walsingham, 1914)
Phyllonorycter platani (Staudinger, 1870)
Phyllonorycter populi (Filipjev, 1931)
Phyllonorycter populialbae (Kuznetzov, 1961)
Phyllonorycter populicola (Kuznetzov, 1975)
Phyllonorycter populiella (Chambers, 1878)
Phyllonorycter populifoliella (Treitschke, 1833)
Phyllonorycter propinquinella (Braun, 1908)
Phyllonorycter pruinosella (Gerasimov, 1931)
Phyllonorycter pseuditeina Kumata, 1973
Phyllonorycter pseudojezoniella Noreika, 1994
Phyllonorycter pseudojoviella Deschka, 1974
Phyllonorycter pseudolautella (Kumata, 1963)
Phyllonorycter pseudoplataniella (Ragonot, 1873)
Phyllonorycter pterocaryae (Kumata, 1963)
Phyllonorycter pulchra (Kumata, 1963)
Phyllonorycter pumila Lastuvka & Lastuvka, 2006
Phyllonorycter pumilae (Ermolaev, 1981)
Phyllonorycter purgantella (Chrétien, 1910)
Phyllonorycter pygmaea (Kumata, 1963)
Phyllonorycter pyrifoliella (Gerasimov, 1933)
Phyllonorycter pyrispinosae Deschka, 1986
Phyllonorycter quercialbella (Fitch, 1859)
Phyllonorycter quercifoliella (Zeller, 1839)
Phyllonorycter quercus (Amsel, 1935)
Phyllonorycter quinqueguttella (Stainton, 1851)
Phyllonorycter raikhonae Noreika, 1993
Phyllonorycter rajella (Linnaeus, 1758)
Phyllonorycter rebimbasi (Mendes, 1910)
Phyllonorycter reduncata (Ermolaev, 1986)
Phyllonorycter restrictella (Braun, 1939)
Phyllonorycter retamella (Chrétien, 1915)
Phyllonorycter rhododendrella (Braun, 1935)
Phyllonorycter rhynchosiae (Vári, 1961)
Phyllonorycter ribefoliae (Braun, 1939)
Phyllonorycter rileyella (Chambers, 1875)
Phyllonorycter ringoniella (Matsumura, 1931)
Phyllonorycter roboris (Zeller, 1839)
Phyllonorycter rolandi (Svensson, 1966)
Phyllonorycter rongensis de Prins, 2012
Phyllonorycter rostrispinosa (Kumata, 1963)
Phyllonorycter rubicola Kumata, 1973
Phyllonorycter ruizivorus de Prins, 2012
Phyllonorycter ruwenzori de Prins, 2012
Phyllonorycter sagitella (Bjerkander, 1790)
Phyllonorycter salicicolella (Sircom, 1848)
Phyllonorycter salicifoliella (Chambers, 1871)
Phyllonorycter salictella (Zeller, 1846)
Phyllonorycter sandraella (Opler, 1971)
Phyllonorycter scabiosella (Douglas, 1853)
Phyllonorycter schreberella (Fabricius, 1781)
Phyllonorycter scitulella (Duponchel, 1843)
Phyllonorycter scopariella (Zeller, 1846)
Phyllonorycter scudderella (Frey & Boll, 1873)
Phyllonorycter sexnotella (Chambers, 1880)
Phyllonorycter sibirica Kuznetzov & Baryshnikova, 2001
Phyllonorycter silvicola de Prins, 2012
Phyllonorycter similis Kumata, 1982
Phyllonorycter solani (E. M. Hering, 1958)
Phyllonorycter sorbi (Frey, 1855)
Phyllonorycter sorbicola (Kumata, 1963)
Phyllonorycter spartocytisi (M. Hering, 1927)
Phyllonorycter spinicolella (Zeller, 1846)
Phyllonorycter splendidus Deschka, 2013
Phyllonorycter staintoniella (Nicelli, 1853)
Phyllonorycter stephanandrae (Kumata, 1967)
Phyllonorycter stephanota (Meyrick, 1907)
Phyllonorycter stettinensis (Nicelli, 1852)
Phyllonorycter stigmaphyllae Busck, 1934
Phyllonorycter strigulatella (Zeller, 1846)
Phyllonorycter styracis (Kumata, 1963)
Phyllonorycter suaveolentis (Petry, 1904)
Phyllonorycter suberifoliella (Zeller, 1850)
Phyllonorycter sublautella (Stainton, 1869)
Phyllonorycter symphoricarpaeella (Chambers, 1875)
Phyllonorycter takagii (Kumata, 1963)
Phyllonorycter tangerensis (Stainton, 1872)
Phyllonorycter tauricus Deschka, 2013
Phyllonorycter telinella Lastuvka & Lastuvka, 2006
Phyllonorycter tenebriosa (Kumata, 1967)
Phyllonorycter tenerella (de Joannis, 1915)
Phyllonorycter tenuicaudella (Walsingham, 1897)
Phyllonorycter tiliacella (Chambers, 1871)
Phyllonorycter triarcha (Meyrick, 1908)
Phyllonorycter tribhuvani Kumata, 1973
Phyllonorycter tridentatae Lastuvka & Lastuvka, 2006
Phyllonorycter trifasciella (Haworth, 1828)
Phyllonorycter triflorella (Peyerimhoff, 1871)
Phyllonorycter trifoliella (Gerasimov, 1933)
Phyllonorycter trinotella (Braun, 1908)
Phyllonorycter triplacomis (Meyrick, 1936)
Phyllonorycter triplex (Meyrick, 1914)
Phyllonorycter tristrigella (Haworth, 1828)
Phyllonorycter tritaenianella (Chambers, 1871)
Phyllonorycter tritorrhecta (Meyrick, 1935)
Phyllonorycter trochetellus de Prins, 2012
Phyllonorycter trojana Deschka, 1982
Phyllonorycter troodi Deschka, 1974
Phyllonorycter tsavensis de Prins, 2012
Phyllonorycter turanica (Gerasimov, 1931)
Phyllonorycter turcomanicella (Kuznetzov, 1956)
Phyllonorycter turensis de Prins, 2012
Phyllonorycter turugisana (Kumata, 1963)
Phyllonorycter uchidai (Kumata, 1963)
Phyllonorycter ulicicolella (Stainton, 1851)
Phyllonorycter ulmi (Kumata, 1963)
Phyllonorycter ulmifoliella (Hübner, 1817)
Phyllonorycter umukarus de Prins, 2012
Phyllonorycter valentina (Ermolaev, 1981)
Phyllonorycter viburnella (Braun, 1923)
Phyllonorycter viburni (Kumata, 1963)
Phyllonorycter viciae (Kumata, 1963)
Phyllonorycter viminetorum (Stainton, 1854)
Phyllonorycter vueltas Lastuvka & Lastuvka, 2006
Phyllonorycter vulturella (Deschka, 1968)
Phyllonorycter watanabei (Kumata, 1963)
Phyllonorycter yakusimensis (Kumata, 1967)
Phyllonorycter yamadai Kumata, 1973
Phyllonorycter zelkovae (Kumata, 1963)
Phyllonorycter zonochares (Meyrick, 1933)

Recently moved species
Phyllonorycter aurifascia (Walker, 1875)
Phyllonorycter morrisella (Fitch, 1859), moved to Macrosaccus Davis & De Prins, 2011
Phyllonorycter robiniella (Clemens, 1859), moved to Macrosaccus Davis & De Prins, 2011, of which it is the type species
Phyllonorycter uhlerella (Fitch, 1859), moved to Macrosaccus Davis & De Prins, 2011

Species of unknown status
Phyllonorycter crocinella (Sorhagen, 1900), original combination Lithocolletis crocinella. This species was described from Germany. The identity remains questionable, since no type material is known to exist and no further collections have been authenticated since it was described. Although it was originally reported as a leafminer on Salix, Spuler (1910) considered it only as a form of Phyllonorycter kleemannella (Fabricius), which mines the leaves of Alnus.
Phyllonorycter graeseriella (Sorhagen, 1900), original combination Lithocolletis graeseriella. This species was described from Germany. The identity remains questionable, since no type material is known to exist and no further collections have been authenticated since it was described.
Phyllonorycter salincolella (Sorhagen, 1900), original combination Lithocolletis salincolella. This species was described from Germany. The identity remains questionable, since no type material is known to exist and no further collections have been authenticated since it was described. Without explanation, Kuznetsov (1981) treated salincolella as a form of Phyllonorycter rajella which feeds on Alnus, although the original records report salincolella on Salix caprea.

References

External links

 Fauna Europaea
 Biology and Systematics of the North American Phyllonorycter Leafminers on Salicaceae, with a Synoptic Catalog of the Palearctic Species (Lepidoptera: Gracillariidae)
 Global Taxonomic Database of Gracillariidae (Lepidoptera)

 
Lithocolletinae
Gracillarioidea genera
Taxa named by Jacob Hübner